Vitín is a municipality and village in České Budějovice District in the South Bohemian Region of the Czech Republic. It has about 500 inhabitants. The historic centre of the village is well preserved and is protected by law as a village monument zone.

Geography
It lies on the border between the Tábor Uplands and Třeboň Basin.

History
The first written mention of Vitín is from 1459.

Transport
The D3 motorway runs through the municipality.

Sights
Vitín is known for two large pagan Slavic barrow cemeteries dating to early Middle Ages, (8th–9th century). They are located on the slopes of the Bába hill, one of them is inside the municipality of Vitín and one of them is outside. They are one of the best preserved in the country. The cemeteries contain 69 and 80 barrows ordered in distinct lines going from the west to the east. The highest of them have about 4–5 metres in diameter and are 2 metres high.

References

External links

Villages in České Budějovice District